St. Malo is a local urban district located in the Rural Municipality of De Salaberry, approximately 70 km south of The Forks, Winnipeg, Manitoba. Most of the community's residents are bilingual francophone of Métis or Québécois heritage.

Early history
Chronology of the early settlement of St. Malo:
1877 — Born in Varennes, Quebec, Louis Malo is the first pioneer to settle in St. Malo.
1878 — Opening of the Pembina Branch rail line from St. Boniface to Dominion City through nearby Dufrost station. The new rail route resulted in the phasing-out of the generations-old Crow Wing ox trail through St. Malo; Dufrost began part of St. Malo parish.
1884 — Surveying of the St. Malo Settlement of lots along the Rat River (a tributary of the Red River) from the southern edge of the village of St. Malo to La Rochelle.
1892 — Opening of register for the St. Malo parish of the Manitoban archdiocese of St. Boniface. St. Malo Post Office established 1 February 1892.
1977 - On July 18, an F4 tore through the community, killing three and destroying several houses. Asphalt was peeled off of highway roads.

Geography
St. Malo lies in the eastern edge of the remarkably flat Red River flood plain, which was once the lake shore of Lake Agassiz at the transition between southeastern Manitoba's upland woodlands to the east and the flat prairie grasslands to the west.

Demographics 

Amenities
St. Malo is a shopping and services centre for the surrounding rural area; it is also recognized for its tourist attractions and farming.

Popular activities in St. Malo during the winter months include snowmobiling, cross-country skiing, hockey, as well as ice-fishing and car racing on the lake. In February 2008, the Friends of the Park ("Les Amis du Parc") organized its first annual Festival of Friends ("Festival des Amis").

École Saint-Malo School is the community's elementary and middle school and is part of the Red River Valley School Division. The school offers both French Immersion and English programs.

Notable people
 Travis Hamonic, NHL player
 Daniel Joseph Marion, politician

See also
 Red River Trails

Friendship communities
 Rural Municipality of De Salaberry, Manitoba, Canada
 Community of La Rochelle, Manitoba, Canada
 Village of Saint-Pierre-Jolys, Manitoba, Canada
 Village of Saint-Malo, Quebec, Canada
 Port city of Saint-Malo, Brittany, France

References

Bibliography 

 68 pages, L&A Canada link

 

Saint Malo
Saint Malo
Unincorporated communities in Eastman Region, Manitoba
Manitoba communities with majority francophone populations